Psi Centauri, which is Latinized from ψ Centauri, is a binary star system in the southern constellation of Centaurus. It is visible to the naked eye with a baseline apparent visual magnitude of +4.05. The distance to this system is approximately 259 light years based on parallax. The radial velocity is poorly constrained, but it appears to be slowly drifting away from the Sun at the rate of +2 km/s.

This is a detached eclipsing binary system with the secondary eclipse being total. The pair are orbiting each other with a period of 38.81 days and an eccentricity of 0.55. The brightness of the system dips by 0.28 and 0.16 magnitude during the two eclipses per orbit. The system displays an infrared excess at a wavelength of 60 μm, indicating the presence of a circumstellar debris disk with a temperature of 120 K, orbiting at a distance of 64 AU.

The pair have a combined stellar classification of A0 IV, matching a white-hued A-type subgiant. The two components appear to be at different evolutionary stages. Both have high rotation rates, with projected rotational velocities over 120 km/s. The primary has 3.6 times the Sun's radius while the secondary is 1.8 times. The primary showed evidence of pulsational behavior with 1.996 and 5.127 cycles per day, which suggests it is a slowly pulsating B star. But this remains unconfirmed as of 2017, and the finding may instead be the result of instrumental error.

References

A-type subgiants
Eclipsing binaries

Centaurus (constellation)
Centauri, Psi
Durchmusterung objects
070090
125473
5367